The 2014 GP du Canton d'Argovie (Frauen Grand Prix Gippingen) the first running of the GP du Canton d'Argovie, a women's bicycle race in Gippingen, Switzerland. It was rated by the UCI as a 1.2 category race.

Results

References

2014 in women's road cycling
International cycle races hosted by Switzerland
2014 in Swiss sport